Corke is a surname.

People named Corke include:
Anya Corke (born 1990), Hong Kong chess grandmaster
Fiona Corke (born 1961), Australian actress
Hilary Corke (1921–2001), British writer, composer and mineralogist
Kevin Corke (fl. 1990–present), United States television news correspondent
Martin Corke (1923–1994), English cricketer and businessman
Peter Corke (born 1959), Australian roboticist

See also
Cork (surname)